The 2010–11 Bill Beaumont Cup (Rugby Union County Championship) was the 111th edition of England's County Championship rugby union club competition. 

Lancashire won their 21st title after defeating Hertfordshire in the final.

Final

See also
 English rugby union system
 Rugby union in England

References

Rugby Union County Championship
County Championship (rugby union) seasons